The Royal Almonry is a small office within the Royal Households of the United Kingdom, headed by the Lord High Almoner, an office dating from 1103. The almoner is responsible for distributing alms to the poor.

The Lord High Almoner is usually a diocesan bishop or high cleric of the Church of England. The current holder of the office is the Bishop of Worcester, the Right Reverend John Inge. There is also an hereditary Grand Almoner, an office dating from 1685 and vested in the person of the Marquess of Exeter, but this is not an office of the Royal Almonry and he has no role to play. The actual work of the office is undertaken by the Sub-Almoner (currently Paul Wright), who is also the Deputy Clerk of the Closet of the Ecclesiastical Household, Sub-dean of the Chapel Royal, and Domestic Chaplain at Buckingham Palace.

There are in addition a Secretary, and Assistant Secretary, both offices of which are shared with other Royal Household appointments. There are also half a dozen wandsmen.

The Almonry is responsible to the Keeper of the Privy Purse for the arrangements for the annual Maundy service.

Lord High Almoners 

Henry III (1216)
 John Leukenor, Knight Templar 
1233: Brother John and Brother Geoffrey (to 1239) 
1255–unknown: Simon of Offam 
1256–unknown: John of Colchester 
1257: John the Chaplain
Edward I (1272)
 Friar Ralph 
c.1280–1307: Master Henry of Blunsdon 
Edward II (1307)
 c.1323: Adam de Brome
Edward III (1327)
 c.1340: Philip Weston  
 Thomas Hatfield (Bishop of Durham, 1345)
Richard II (1377)
 1383: William Walsham 
Henry IV (1399)
1399: Robert Eslakby 
? –1413 Earl of Cambridge
Henry V (1413)
 1413–unknown: James Tuchet, 5th Baron Audley
 Henry VI (1422)
 142n–unknown: John Snell 
 ?–1432: John De la Bere (later Bishop of St David's, 1447)  
 1432–1438: Robert Felton 
 1438–unknown: Henry Sever, Chancellor of St Paul's Cathedral
Edward IV (1461)
 1461–?1466: Thomas Wilford 
 ?1466–1468: Thomas Bonyfaunt 
 1468–1476: John Gunthorpe, Dean of Wells and, until 1478, Archdeacon of Essex
 1471: Alexander Legh
 1476–1483: Thomas Danet 
 1483: Walter Felde 
Richard III (1483)
 1483-1485 John Taillour 
Henry VII (1485) 
 1485–1495: Christopher Urswick
 1495-1497: Richard FitzJames
 1497–unknown: Richard Mayew, Bishop of Hereford (died 1516)
 unknown: Christopher Bainbridge
 28 January 1507 - 1509: John Ednam (Edenham)
 unknown–1509: Thomas Hobbes, Dean of Exeter. 
Henry VIII (1509); Edward VI (1547); Mary I (1553)
 1509–1514: Cardinal Thomas Wolsey, Archbishop of York (etc.) 
 1514–unknown: Richard Rawlins, Archdeacon of Huntingdon (later Bishop of St David's), 1523) (died 1528)
 1521–unknown: John Longland, Bishop of Lincoln (died 1547) 
 1523–unknown: Edward Lee (later Archbishop of York, 1531) 
 1530–unknown: John Stokesley, Bishop of London (died 1539)
c.1532–1537: Edward Foxe, Bishop of Hereford, 1535
 1537–>1555: Nicholas Heath, Bishop of Rochester (died 1578)
Elizabeth I (1558)
 1559–1561: William Bill, Master of Trinity
 1561–1572: Edmund Guest, Bishop of Rochester. 
 1576–unknown: John Piers, Bishop of Salisbury, later Archbishop of York. {died 1594)
 29 March 1572 – 1591: Edmund Freke, Bishop of Worcester
 1591–1594: Richard Fletcher, Bishop of Bristol
 1595–unknown: Anthony Watson, Bishop of Chichester (died 1605)
James I (1603)
 1605–1626: Lancelot Andrewes, Bishop of Chichester, then of Ely
 1619–unknown: George Montaigne (or Mountain), Bishop of London (etc.) (died 1628)
Charles I (1625)
 1626: Francis White, Bishop of Carlisle, then Bishop of Norwich and Bishop of Ely   (died 1638)
 1632–unknown: Walter Curle, Prelate of the Garter and Bishop of Winchester (died 1647)
Commonwealth (1649-1660)
Charles II (1660)
 1660–1662: Brian Duppa, Bishop of Winchester
 1662–1675: Humphrey Henchman, Bishop of Salisbury, then Bishop of London
 1675–1684: John Dolben, Bishop of Rochester
James II (1685)
 1684–1687: Francis Turner, Bishop of Ely
 1687: John Leyburn, Vicar Apostolic of England
 1687–1689: The Hon Cardinal Philip Howard
William III (1689); Anne (1702)
 1689–1703: William Lloyd, Bishop of St Asaph, then of Lichfield and Coventry, then of Worcester
 1703–1714: John Sharp, Archbishop of York
George I (1714); George II (1727)
 1714–1715: George Smalridge, Bishop of Bristol
 1715–1716: William Wake, Bishop of Lincoln
 1716–1718: William Nicolson, Bishop of Carlisle
 1718–1723: Richard Willis, Bishop of Gloucester
 1723–1743: Lancelot Blackburne, Archbishop of York
 1743–1748: Thomas Sherlock, Bishop of Salisbury
 1748–1757: Matthew Hutton, Archbishop of York
 1757–1761: John Gilbert, Archbishop of York
George III (1760); George IV (1820); William IV (1830); Victoria (1837)
 1761–1777: The Hon Robert Hay Drummond, Archbishop of York
 1777–1808: William Markham, Archbishop of York
 1808–1847: The Hon Edward Venables-Vernon-Harcourt, Archbishop of York
 1847–1870: Samuel Wilberforce, Bishop of Oxford, then of Winchester
 1870–1882: The Hon Gerald Wellesley, Dean of Windsor
 1882–1906: Lord Alwyne Compton, Bishop of Ely
Edward VII (1901); George V (1910)
 1906–1933: Joseph Armitage Robinson, Dean of Westminster, then of Wells
Edward VIII (1936); George VI (1936); Elizabeth II (1952); Charles III (2022)
 1933–1945: Cosmo Gordon Lang, Archbishop of Canterbury
 1946–1953: Edward Woods, Bishop of Lichfield
 1953–1970: Michael Gresford Jones, Bishop of St Albans
 1970–1988: David Say, Bishop of Rochester
 1988–1997: John Taylor, Bishop of St Albans
 1997–2013: Nigel McCulloch, Bishop of Manchester
 2013–present: John Inge, Bishop of Worcester

References

Sources
 
 

1103 establishments in England
Anglican ecclesiastical offices
Church of England lists
Lists of English people
Lists of office-holders in the United Kingdom
British monarchy
Almoners